Ben Anderson is a Minneapolis-born entrepreneur and the founder of Cinemotion, LLC.
Anderson, a graduate of the University of Saint Thomas is currently CEO of AutoMotion.

Early life and background

Ben was home-educated from kindergarten, graduating from the University of Saint Thomas in 2005 with a degree in entrepreneurship.

Recognition

Anderson founded Cinemotion in 2001 while at St. Thomas.   Ben received the 2005 Pentair Student Entrepreneur of the Year honor from the St. Thomas College of Business  and a Minnesota Collegiate Entrepreneur award in 2006.
Anderson was a finalist in the 2006 Global Student Entrepreneur Awards and was a semi-finalist in the MN Cup the same year.  He has been covered in the press by BusinessWeek, Minneapolis/St. Paul Star Tribune, Twin Cities Business Monthly, and Twin Cities Business among others.
Anderson was a finalist to appear on the first season of Shark Tank but declined based on contract terms.
Ben Anderson, was awarded the 2011 Young Entrepreneur of the Year by the US Small Business Administration.
Anderson was a featured speaker for OEMs and various auto-tech events including J.D. Power 
and General Motors.

Social Media Dissent 
An original vocal critic of social media, Anderson has stated that he has never had any social media accounts, including Facebook and LinkedIn. Anderson's speeches have included the motto, "don't put your data in other's hands" and reference strategies to control personal information on the web.

Racing career
Anderson is also a professional auto racing driver, competing in sports car racing events.
In 2014 Anderson won the NASA East Championships.
Anderson was a finalist in the 2014 Mazdaspeed Shootout.
Anderson won the 2015 NASA West Championships at Mazda Raceway Laguna Seca.
In 2017 Anderson formed Ben Anderson Racing Driver Development and formed a new Formula 4 United States Championship team.

References

Living people
1981 births